Snowdown railway station is on the Dover branch of the Chatham Main Line in England, and serves the hamlet of Snowdown, Kent.

The station and all trains that call are operated by Southeastern.

The station and the line it serves was built by the London, Chatham & Dover Railway, and the station was opened in 1914. It was formerly known as Snowdown & Nonington Halt and formed the junction with the extensive sidings of the National Coal Board at  Snowdown Colliery.

Facilities
Snowdown station is unstaffed and facilities are limited. Tickets can be purchased from the self-service ticket machine at the station and there are passenger help points located on each platforms. There is also a basic shelter located on each platform.

Step-free access is not available to either of the platforms at the station.

Services

All services at Snowdown are operated by Southeastern using  EMUs.

The typical off-peak service in trains per hour is:
 1 tph to  via 
 1 tph to 

During the peak hours, the service is increased to 2 tph.

References

External links

Dover District
Railway stations in Kent
DfT Category F2 stations
Former London, Chatham and Dover Railway stations
Railway stations in Great Britain opened in 1914
Railway stations served by Southeastern